Mei Li Vos (born 31 March 1970) is a Dutch politician, former trade unionist and editorialist. A member of the Labour Party (PvdA), she was a member of the House of Representatives from 1 March 2007 to 17 June 2010 and again from 20 September 2012 until 23 March 2017. She has been a member of the Senate since 11 June 2019, serving as parliamentary leader.

Early life
Mei Li Vos was born on 31 March 1970 in Eindhoven in the Netherlands.

Vos comes from a family with five brothers. Her mother was Chinese Indonesian, established in the Dutch East Indies. . During her youth her family lived in a Christian commune in Veldhoven. Between 1982 and 1988 she attended the vwo at the Christian Lyceum in Arnhem.

Academic career
Between 1988 and 1989 she studied General Social Science at the University of Utrecht. Vos studied political science at the University of Amsterdam. Between 1994 and 2002 she worked as teacher and researcher at the political science department of the University of Amsterdam. In 1994-1995 she also worked part-time as manager of the Maarten Altena Ensemble. From 1995 and 2000 she worked on her thesis, which concerned the relationship between the Netherlands and Indonesia. She specifically researched what the effect was of Indonesia refusing development cooperation of the Netherlands on cooperation in higher education, industry and the legal profession. Her thesis was titled "International cooperation between politics and practice: how Dutch Indonesian cooperation changed remarkably little after a diplomatic rupture".

Since 2000 she also worked part-time as a researcher at the think tank Infodrome, where she wrote a study on the information revolution and its effect on society. Based on her work here she published two books on the information society. In 2001 she was promoted there at the Political Science department. Between 2002 and 2004 she worked at United Knowledge, where she advised the government on the information society. Based on her work advising the Ministry of Economic Affairs she published a book on empowerment. Between 2004 and 2005 she worked at the Ministry of General Affairs and the government PR service. As such she coordinated the norms and values cabinet project.

Alternative for Trade Union
In 2005 she was one of the founders of the Alternative for Trade Union (Alternatief voor Vakbond, AVV), a trade union specifically oriented at young people, part-time employed, freelancers, with temporary work and people on a flexible contract. The union was founded as an alternative for the FNV, which was, according to AVV-founders too concerned with the interest of elderly workers. In 2005 she became the union's chair. Additionally she got a column with the Vrij Nederland and the de Volkskrant. She also worked for the Ministry of Justice as a researcher on the relationship between migration, integration and the welfare state. In 2006 she published a book "the workers' paradise" on the future of the welfare state, employment and labour.

Political career
In the 2006 elections Vos was placed on place 38 of the list of the PvdA. Both the conservative liberal VVD and the progressive liberal D66 had asked Vos to consider running for them. Because of the PvdA did not perform particularly well in the elections, Vos was not elected immediately. When several MPs became minister in the Fourth Balkenende cabinet Vos did get a seat. Vos was spokesperson on freelancer-, temporarily employed and consumer affairs. She sat on the commissions on finance, European Affairs, Economic Affairs, Social Affairs and the Environment. Vos also was member of the board of directors of the public radio broadcaster FunX. As an MP she wanted to give free lancers and the temporarily employed a voice in parliament and share the risks of a dynamic labour market more equally between free lancers, part-time employed and temporarily employed and people with a fixed contract. Vos considers herself to be a social liberal, while the PvdA is a social-democratic party.

Her term in the House ended on 23 March 2017.

She was lijsttrekker of the PvdA in the 2019 Senate election. She has been a member of the Senate since 11 June 2019, serving as parliamentary leader.

References

External links

1970 births
21st-century Dutch politicians
21st-century Dutch women politicians
Academic staff of the University of Amsterdam
Dutch magazine editors
Dutch people of Chinese descent
Dutch politicians of Chinese descent
Dutch people of Indonesian descent
Dutch public relations people
Dutch trade unionists
Labour Party (Netherlands) politicians
Living people
Members of the House of Representatives (Netherlands)
People from Eindhoven
Protestant Church Christians from the Netherlands
University of Amsterdam alumni
Women magazine editors